508 may refer to:
 508 (number), the number
 508, the year 508 (DVIII) of the Julian calendar
 508 BC
 508th (disambiguation)
 Section 508 Amendment to the Rehabilitation Act of 1973
 Area code 508, an area code in southeastern Massachusetts

Automobiles
 Fiat 508
 Peugeot 508